David John Coleman (27 March 1942 – 23 September 2016) was an English footballer who played in the Football League as a forward for Colchester United.

Career

Born in Colchester in 1942, Coleman began his career with local clubs Stanway Rovers and Harwich & Parkeston in non-league football before moving into the Football League with hometown club Colchester United.

Coleman made his debut on 18 November 1961 in a Fourth Division away tie at Rochdale, a game which the U's won 1–0. He would only make one more Football League appearance for Colchester, coming the following season on 20 October in a 4–1 defeat away to Wrexham, with Coleman scoring the solitary goal for Colchester.

After leaving Colchester, Coleman joined another local non-league club, Clacton Town.

Coleman died on 23 September 2016 from cancer.

References

1942 births
2016 deaths
Sportspeople from Colchester
English footballers
Association football forwards
Stanway Rovers F.C. players
Harwich & Parkeston F.C. players
Colchester United F.C. players
F.C. Clacton players
English Football League players